John Roger Roberts, Baron Roberts of Llandudno (born 23 October 1935), is a Welsh Liberal Democrat politician, Methodist minister, and life peer. He was for many years President of the Welsh Liberals, and later, the Welsh Liberal Democrats.

Early life and education
Lord Roberts was educated at John Bright Grammar School, in Llandudno, the University College of North Wales, and Handsworth Methodist College, Birmingham.

Career

Ordained ministry
In 1957, he became a Methodist minister, and was the superintendent Methodist minister at Llandudno for twenty years before serving as minister at the Dewi Sant (Welsh United) Church, Toronto. He is an active supernumerary minister in North Wales.

Political career
He was a councillor and a leader of the Liberal Democrats on Aberconwy Borough Council for a number of years, and stood as a candidate for the parliamentary seat of Conwy five times. He narrowly missed being elected the last two times he stood, first coming close to beating the Conservatives, with only a margin of 995 votes, and then being beaten by Labour in the General Election of 1997, when the Conservatives lost their majority in the House of Commons.

On 15 June 2004, Roberts was created a life peer as Baron Roberts of Llandudno, of Llandudno in the County of Gwynedd. A former whip and spokesperson on International Development, he now speaks on youth democratic engagement, unemployment, asylum, migration and Welsh affairs for the Liberal Democrats in the House of Lords.

Roberts is currently president of Wales International, is honorary president of Bite The Ballot, Liberal Democrats for Seekers of Sanctuary (LD4SOS) and Friends of Barka UK and is also vice-president of Llangollen International Music Eisteddfod.

Personal life
Roberts' latest book, Hel Tai, is only available in Welsh.

He is a widower with three children and lives in Llandudno on the Creuddyn peninsula, North Wales. His son, Gareth Roberts, also stood for the same seat for the Liberal Democrats in 2005. His two daughters, Rhian Roberts and Sian Roberts work for the BBC and the Electoral Reform Services respectively.

References

External links 
Lord Roberts of Llandudno's website.
Lord Roberts of Llandudno profile at the site of Liberal Democrats.

1935 births
Living people
Councillors in Wales
Liberal Democrats (UK) life peers
People from Llandudno
Welsh-speaking politicians
Liberal Democrats (UK) parliamentary candidates
Liberal Democrats (UK) councillors
Welsh Methodist ministers
Liberal Party (UK) politicians
Life peers created by Elizabeth II